Hugo O'Donnell y Duque de Estrada, 7th Duke of Tetuán, GE, OM (born 29 September 1948), is a Spanish peer and historian who was the vice president of the International Commission for Maritime History, censor of the Real Academia de la Historia, and elect member of the Royal Historical Society.

Life
He succeeded his father, Leopoldo O'Donnell y Lara, as Duke of Tetuán and Grandee of Spain (confirmed by Ministry of Justice in Madrid: BOE 240 dated 7 October 2005). The title commemorates the conquest of Tetuan in Morocco in the mid-19th century by his ancestor, Leopoldo O'Donnell y Jorris, 1st Duke of Tetuán and Prime Minister of Spain.

He is the recognised Tánaiste (heir apparent) to The O'Donnell of Tyrconnell, Prince and Chief of the Name of the O'Donnells, who is a retired Franciscan priest, Fr. Hugh O'Donel, and whom he will succeed as Chief of the Name, according to authors Curley and Ellis referenced below.

The duke is an active member of the Clan Association of the O'Donnells of Tyrconnell (of Ireland), and he is a Knight of Malta. The duke is a naval historian, and also a former naval commander and Minister for the Marine in Spain.

He was elected to medalla nº 2 of the Real Academia de la Historia on 22 June 2001, and he took up his seat on 1 February 2004.

Marriage and issue
The duke is married to Maria de la Asunción Armada y Díez de Rivera. Together, they had four children:
Carlos Leopoldo O'Donnell, 15th Marquess of Altamira and Grandee of Spain (born 1974)
Maria Fuencisla O'Donnell (born 1975)
Hugo José O'Donnell, 9th Marquess of las Salinas (born 1979)
Alfonso O'Donnell, 7th Count of Lucena (born 1984)

See also
Spanish nobility

References

Bibliography
 Curley, Walter J. P., with foreword by Charles Lysaght (2004). Vanishing Kingdoms. The Irish Chiefs and Their Families. Dublin: Lilliput Press; chapter on O'Donnell of Tyrconnell, p. 59.  & 
 Ellis, Peter Berresford (1999). Erin’s Blood Royal. The Gaelic Noble Dynasties of Ireland. London: Constable; pages 251–258 on the O'Donel, Prince of Tirconnell

External links
Official O'Donnell Clan website
 Referenced works by Hugo O'Donnell y Duque de Estrada, Duke of Tetuán
Don Hugo learns the Irish Language

|-

1948 births
Counts of Lucena
Dukes of Tetuan
Grandees of Spain
Irish naval historians
Living people
Knights of Malta
Marquesses of Altamira
Members of the Real Academia de la Historia
O'Donnell dynasty
Spanish people of Irish descent
Spanish nobility